Shereen Bhan (born 20 August 1976) is an Indian journalist and news anchor. She is the Managing Editor of CNBC-TV18. Shereen took over as managing editor of CNBC-TV18 from 1 September 2013 after Udayan Mukherjee decided to step aside.

Personal
Shereen was born into a Kashmiri Hindu family of the Bhan clan. She did her schooling at Kendriya Vidyalaya in Kashmir and also at Air Force Bal Bharati school (A.F.B.B.S) Lodhi Road, New Delhi. Bhan graduated from St. Stephen's College, Delhi with a degree in Philosophy and a master's in Communication Studies from the University of Pune, with film and television as her area of specialization.

Career
Shereen Bhan has an experience of 20 years, 14 of which were spent in tracking corporate, policy news and events that defined the business landscape in India. She began her career working as a news-researcher for Karan Thapar in his production house Infotainment Television. She joined UTV's News and Current Affairs division and produced shows like We the People for Star TV and Line of Fire for SAB TV. She joined CNBC-TV18 in December 2000. She has been responsible for breaking a range of news stories that have redefined the Indian economic landscape in recent times and has also interviewed some of the biggest names in business and politics, both domestic and global.
Shereen is also the Anchor & Editor of Young Turks, one of India's longest running shows on entrepreneurs – a section that over the last 13 years has successfully built a niche category in business news programming. She hosts Overdrive, which won the News Television Award for the 'Best Auto Show' for three consecutive years. She heads the channel's special feature programming that carries several pioneering shows such as Ministers of Change and What Women Really Want.
Over the course of her 14-year tryst with business journalism, Shereen has been the recipient of the 'Best Business Talk Show' award at the News Television awards for two years consecutively. She also won the 'FICCI Woman of the Year' award for her contribution to the Media in 2005, and was named a 'Young Global Leader' by the World Economic Forum. She won the ‘Best Business Anchor Award’ at the ‘News Television Awards’ in 2013.

Bhan anchors and produces several shows like Young Turks, India Business Hour, The Nation's Business and Power Turks. She also anchors and puts together CNBC-TV18's ground events like the Managing India brainstorm and the CNBC Industry Vectors.

Awards
In April 2005, she was awarded the FICCI Woman of the Year award. 
Women's magazine Femina included her among the 20 Beautiful Faces of the year in its September 2005 issue. 
She was featured on the cover of Verve magazine's December 2008 issue 
Shereen figured among the 50 most Beautiful Women in the Vogue October 2008 issue. 
In 2009, the World Economic Forum named her as one of the Young Global Leaders of 2009.
In 2021, Best News Presenter or Anchor, India Business Hour, 26th Asian Television Awards (Nominated)

References

External links

 

Living people
Indian women television journalists
Indian television journalists
St. Stephen's College, Delhi alumni
Savitribai Phule Pune University alumni
Delhi University alumni
Kendriya Vidyalaya alumni
Kashmiri people
1976 births
Articles created or expanded during Women's History Month (India) - 2015
Indian women television presenters
Indian television presenters
Journalists from Jammu and Kashmir
Women writers from Jammu and Kashmir
21st-century Indian women writers
21st-century Indian writers
21st-century Indian journalists
Indian business and financial journalists
Women business and financial journalists
Indian journalists
Managing editors
Kashmiri Pandits
Indian people of Kashmiri descent